Nathan Taylor Stratton (March 17, 1813 – March 9, 1887) was an American Democratic Party politician who represented New Jersey's 1st congressional district in the United States House of Representatives for two terms from 1851 to 1855.

Early life and education
Stratton was born in Pilesgrove Township, New Jersey on March 17, 1813, where he attended the common schools.

Career
He moved to Mullica Hill, New Jersey (within Harrison Township) in 1829 and clerked in a store, becoming a partner of his employer in 1835. He conducted his own business from 1840 to 1886. He was a member of the New Jersey General Assembly from 1843 to 1844, and was a Justice of the Peace from 1844 to 1847. He also engaged in the real estate business and in agricultural pursuits, and held several local offices.

Congress
Stratton was elected as a Democrat to the Thirty-second and Thirty-third Congresses, serving in office from March 4, 1851 to March 3, 1855, but was not a candidate for renomination in 1854.

After Congress
He again engaged in mercantile pursuits. He was elected as a member of the Harrison Township committee in 1865. He served as State tax commissioner and as a trustee of the State reform school for boys at Jamesburg, New Jersey from 1865 to 1887. He was a delegate to the Union National Convention of Conservatives at Philadelphia in 1866. He was an unsuccessful candidate for election in 1880 to the Forty-seventh Congress.

Death
He died in Mullica Hill on March 9, 1887, and was interred in the Baptist Cemetery.

External links

Nathan Taylor Stratton at The Political Graveyard

1813 births
1887 deaths
Democratic Party members of the New Jersey General Assembly
People from Harrison Township, New Jersey
People from Salem County, New Jersey
Politicians from Gloucester County, New Jersey
Democratic Party members of the United States House of Representatives from New Jersey
19th-century American politicians